The Caithness Amateur Football Association (CAFA) is a football (soccer) league competition for amateur clubs in the Caithness area of Scotland. The association is affiliated to the Scottish Amateur Football Association.  Like several other Highland and island leagues, fixtures are played over summer rather than the traditional winter calendar.

The association is composed of two divisions of 14 clubs.

League membership
In order to join the association, clubs need to apply and are then voted in by current member clubs.

2022 league members

Division 1

John O’Groats
High Ormlie Hotspur
Lybster
Pentland United
Staxigoe United
Thurso Acks
Wick Groats
Wick Thistle

Division 2

Castletown
Keiss
Thurso Swifts
Thurso Pentland
Top Joes
Watten

Champions
This list is incomplete; you can help by adding missing items with reliable sources.

References

External links
 Caithness Amateur Football Association official site at leaguewebsite.co.uk

Football leagues in Scotland
Sport in Caithness
Amateur association football in Scotland
Football in Highland (council area)